The Carolina Lightnin' was an American soccer club based in Charlotte, North Carolina that was a member of the American Soccer League. The Lightnin' played home matches at American Legion Memorial Stadium. Attendance at home games averaged 6,000 spectators. 20,163 fans attended the September 1981 match against the New York United in which the Lightnin' won the American Soccer League championship by a score of 2–1.

After the ASL folded, the club joined the newly formed United Soccer League as the Charlotte Gold.  However, the team folded at the end of the 1984 season. Pro soccer returned to the city in the form of the Charlotte Eagles in 1993.

Honors
ASL Champions
 1981

ASL Rookie of the Year
 1981 Tony Suarez

ASL First Team All Star
 1981  Don Tobin, Tony Suarez

Year-by-year

Coaches
 Rodney Marsh 1980–1983
 Bob Benson 1980–1983

Notable players
 Bobby Moore (1983)
  Paul Child (1982)
  Pat Fidelia (1982–1984)
 Matt Kennedy (1983)
 Stuart Lee (1983) 25 Apps 11 Goals
 Scott Manning (1981–1982)
 Dave Philpotts (1978–83)
  Dave Pierce (1981–1983) 60 Apps  Winning assist ASL Final 1981
 Mal Roche (1981) 22 Apps 8 Goals
 Derek Smethurst (1982) 6 Apps
 Don Tobin (1981)
  Tony Suarez (1981–1983) 22 Apps 15 Goals
  Dave Power (1981–1983) Captain
 Hugh O'Neill (1981–1982) Winning goal ASL Final 1981
 Santiago Formoso (1981, 1983)

References

 Scott, David. (2007, April 20). Suarez, ex-soccer star and fan favorite, dies. The Charlotte Observer
American Soccer History Archives

Sports teams in Charlotte, North Carolina
Defunct soccer clubs in North Carolina
American Soccer League (1933–1983) teams
1984 disestablishments in North Carolina
Association football clubs disestablished in 1984
1981 establishments in North Carolina
Association football clubs established in 1981